= Mars and Venus with Cupid and a Dog =

Painting by Paolo Veronese

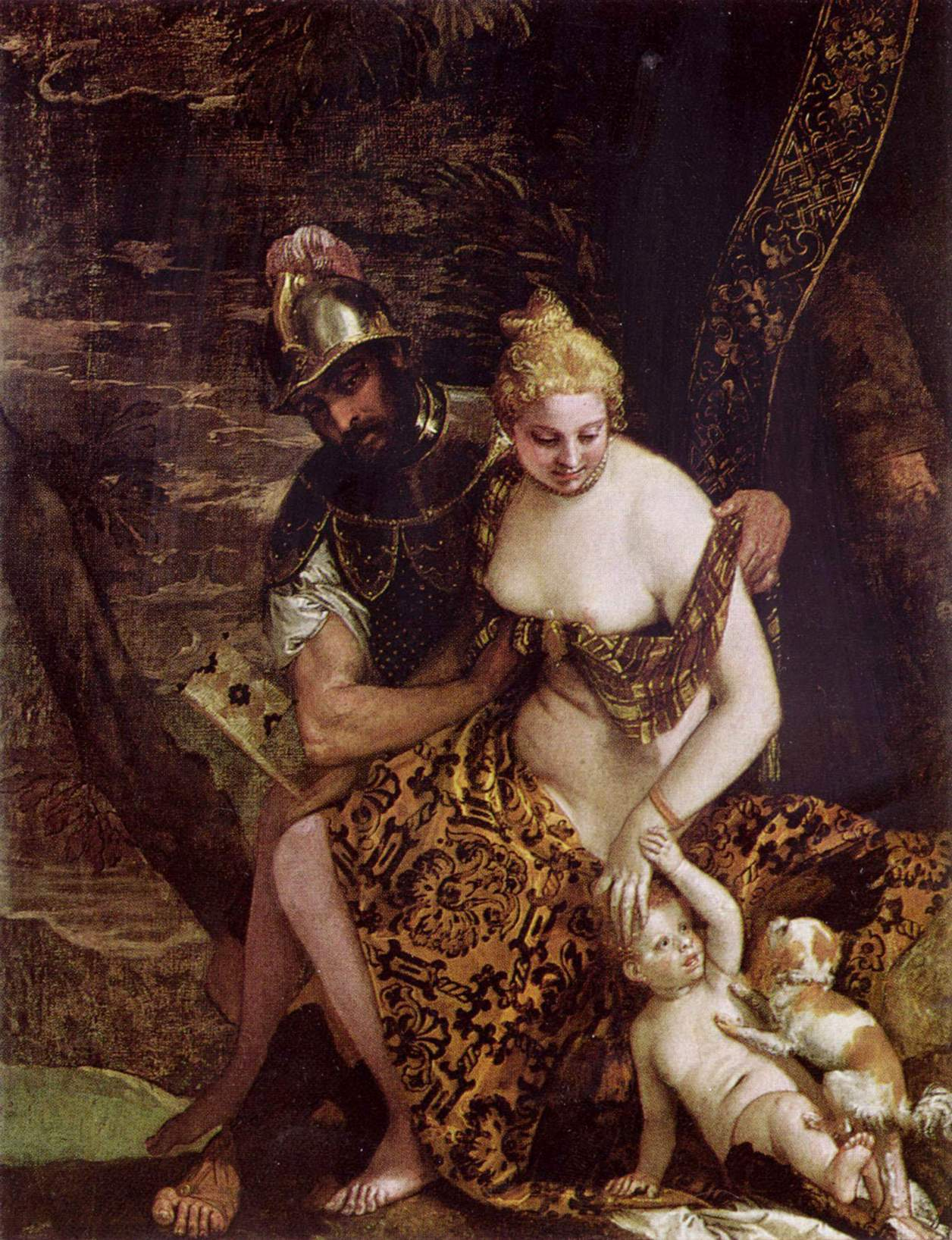
Mars and Venus with Cupid and a Dog (c. 1580) by Paolo Veronese

Mars and Venus with Cupid and a Dog is a 163-by-125-centimetre (64 in × 49 in) oil painting on canvas by Paolo Veronese. It was painted c. 1580 and is in the collection of the National Gallery of Scotland, in Edinburgh. Venus is portrayed wearing a fur and sitting on Mars' knee. At their feet are Cupid and a lapdog.
